Rabioso! La Pesadilla Recién Comienza ("Angry! The Nightmare's Just Begun") is the first Attaque 77 live album.

Overview 
This is the first live album from Attaque 77, released and recorded in 1991 at the Estadio Obras Sanitarias in Buenos Aires.

Track listing
"Introducción" 
"Donde las águilas se atreven" 
"No te pudiste aguantar" 
"Papá Llegó Borracho" 
"Soy de Attaque" 
"Combate" 
"Armas blancas" 
"Espadas y Serpientes"

Credits
Federico Pertusi - Lead vocals.
Mariano Martínez - Guitar.
Ciro Pertusi - Bass, backing vocals.
Leonardo de Cecco - Drums.
Alvaro Villagra - Acoustic guitar on "Caminando Por El Microcentro".

References

External links
Attaque 77's official webpage

Attaque 77 albums
1991 albums
1991 live albums
Spanish-language live albums
Live albums recorded in Buenos Aires